Cherryade is a carbonated soft drink made from cherry juice. It has also been produced as a non-carbonated beverage. 

It was first produced in the 19th century, along with other beverages such as limeade and ginger beer, which had come about due to the popularity of lemonade. The London-based soft drinks company R. White's was a notable early producer of the drink.

See also
 Ade (drink suffix)
 List of brand name soft drinks products
 List of soft drink flavors
 List of soft drink producers
 List of soft drinks by country

References 

Soft drinks
Soft drink flavors
Cherry drinks